The Taurus Model 85 is a small-frame revolver manufactured by Taurus International. In the United States, the guns are marketed for concealed carry and personal protection.

Specifications 
The Model 85 is available in several configurations. These include blued steel, stainless steel, polymer frame, and "Ultralite" variants constructed of aluminum and titanium, with steel lockwork components.

Much like Smith & Wesson revolvers, Model 85s can come equipped with exposed, "bobbed" (850), or shrouded (851) hammers. However, there are a number of significant internal differences between the Taurus 85 and similar Smith & Wesson revolvers. Because of these differences, Taurus has been able to keep costs relatively low. However, those same differences can make customization of the Model 85 more expensive.

There are numerous cosmetic options, including gold-plated hardware and grips of wood or pearl.  The Model 85 is available with either 2" or 3" barrels, is capable of firing +P rated .38 Special rounds, and utilizes a transfer bar safety.

Models manufactured after 1997 feature the Taurus Security System, which consists of a keyed, quarter-turn style socket-head screw which can be set to prevent the hammer from pivoting back into the frame, thus rendering the weapon inoperative.

The Model 85 line has been enlarged to include the Model 856. This model is similar to the Model 85, but adds an additional round in the cylinder to bring the Model 856's capacity to 6 rounds.

The View, also known as the model 85VTA, was introduced in 2014. It has a 1.41 inch barrel, an aluminum frame and titanium cylinder, and a clear polycarbonate side plate for an unloaded weight of 9.5 ounces. Unlike other models, the View is only rated for standard pressure .38 Special ammunition.

Reviews on the 85VTA were mixed. Author Massad Ayoob found the View he shot had accuracy problems and lead bullets tended to "prairie dog" (protrude forward from the recoil) and bind the cylinder. Another reviewer did not have those problems when testing the gun. Ultimately, the View was not a commercial success, and was pulled from production in December 2014. A revised model, the "No View" with an aluminum side plate replacing the clear one was introduced in 2015.

Users

 : Singapore Police Force: Issued to SPF officers in 2002. In 2017, it was announced that they were to be replaced with semi-automatic pistols. The Glock 19 was chosen to replace the Model 85.

See also 
 Taurus Model 605

References

External links
Taurus USA - Revolvers

Taurus revolvers
.38 Special firearms
Military revolvers
Police weapons